Day by Day is a Doris Day album released by Columbia Records on December 17, 1956. The title is an obvious pun, both meaning "on a daily basis" (as implied in the song title) and "(Doris) Day, in the daytime" (and thus leading to a later album entitled Day by Night). The album was issued as Columbia catalog CL-942.

All tracks have vocals by Day accompanied by Paul Weston's orchestra.

The album was combined with Day's 1957 album, Day by Night, on a compact disc, issued on November 14, 2000 by Collectables Records.

Track listing

"The Song Is You" (Jerome Kern, Oscar Hammerstein II) - 3:19
"Hello, My Lover, Goodbye" (Johnny Green, Edward Heyman) - 3:38
"But Not for Me" (George and Ira Gershwin) - 2:38
"I Remember You" (Victor Schertzinger, Johnny Mercer) - 4:02
"I Hadn't Anyone Till You" (Ray Noble) - 3:04
"But Beautiful" (Jimmy Van Heusen, Johnny Burke) - 3:24
"Autumn Leaves" (Joseph Kosma, Jacques Prévert, Johnny Mercer) - 3:03
"Don't Take Your Love from Me" (Henry Nemo) - 3:24
"There Will Never Be Another You" (Harry Warren, Mack Gordon) - 2:43
"Gone with the Wind" (Herbert Magidson, Allie Wrubel) - 2:47
"The Gypsy in My Soul" (Clay Boland, Moe Jaffe) - 3:02
"Day by Day" (Axel Stordahl, Paul Weston, Sammy Cahn) - 3:23

References

Columbia Records albums
1956 albums
Doris Day albums
Albums conducted by Paul Weston